Bresnan Communications was an American cable television provider formed by William Bresnan in 1984. It originally operated cable systems on Michigan's Upper Peninsula. Over the next fourteen years, its operations spread to Minnesota Wisconsin, Mississippi and Georgia. In 1994, the company added international operations in Chile and Poland, with the creation of Bresnan International Partners. The company reached 400,000 subscribers after purchasing systems from TCI. When AT&T acquired TCI, Bresnan began to consider an IPO. Before that could occur, Paul Allen's Charter Communications made an offer, and purchased Bresnan's U.S. cable systems for $3.1 billion, organizing them under Charter Communications' umbrella.

Bresnan re-entered the cable business in April 2002, with the $735 million purchase of former AT&T Broadband Rocky Mountain systems from Comcast. The acquisition included some 300,000 subscribers in Montana, Wyoming, Utah and Colorado.

Cablevision acquired Bresnan on June 13, 2010 for $1.37 billion and rebranded the systems as Optimum West. In February 2013, Charter Communications agreed to buy the former Bresnan systems for $1.625 billion.

See also
List of United States telephone companies

References

Cable television companies of the United States
Companies based in Purchase, New York
Defunct telecommunications companies of the United States
Telecommunications companies established in 1984
American companies established in 1984
Telecommunications companies disestablished in 2010
American companies disestablished in 2010